The Academy Awards for Best Dance Direction was presented from 1935 to 1937, after which it was discontinued due to pressure from the directors' branch. It is notable as being the only category for which a Marx Brothers film received an Oscar nomination, for the dance number All God's Chillun Got Rhythm in A Day at the Races (1937).

Winners and nominees

References

Dance Direction